Caym: Book of Angels Volume 17 is an album by Cyro Baptista's band Banquet of the Spirits performing compositions from John Zorn's second Masada book, "The Book of Angels".

Reception
Warren Allen from All About Jazz stated "This union of Zorn's compositions and Baptista's joyously tight band and world aesthetic makes for one of the most wonderfully exciting and eclectic releases in the series... Amidst the panoply of world grooves, the listener finds mystical chants, astral bells and swirling keys... The album is, in some part, jazz. But it's also everything else—from traditional Moroccan music to Balinese gamelan playing—along with the heavy Brazilian, Middle Eastern and even electronica influences". Tom Volk noted that "Caym is 50 minutes of swirling exotica, navigated by four excellent players who all have their moments in the baked desert sun of which the music is so evocative".

Track listing 
All compositions by John Zorn
 "Chamiel" – 4:27   
 "Matafiel" – 5:21   
 "Briel" – 4:18   
 "Zaphaniah" – 3:53   
 "Tzar Tak" – 3:45   
 "Flaef" – 2:05   
 "Hutriel" – 4:27   
 "Yeqon" – 4:54   
 "Yahel" – 2:26   
 "Tahariel" – 4:46   
 "Natiel" – 4:00   
 "Phaleg" – 4:07

Personnel 
Cyro Baptista – percussion, vocals 
Brian Marsella – piano, harpsichord, pump organ, vocals
Shanir Ezra Blumenkranz – oud, bass, gimbri, vocals 
Tim Keiper – drums, percussion, kamel ngoni, vocals

References 

2011 albums
Albums produced by John Zorn
Tzadik Records albums
Book of Angels albums
Cyro Baptista albums